Louis Raphael Mucci (December 13, 1909, Syracuse, New York - January 4, 2000) was an American jazz trumpeter.

Mucci began as a baritone horn player and was appearing in professional settings by the time he was ten years old. As a teenager he switched to trumpet and worked in the late 1930s with Mildred Bailey and Red Norvo before joining Glenn Miller's ensemble in 1938-1939. During World War II he played in the bands of Bob Chester, Hal McIntyre, Claude Thornhill, and Benny Goodman. In the first half of the 1950s he worked as a house musician for CBS and also recorded with Buddy DeFranco and Artie Shaw; later in the decade he worked with Miles Davis, Helen Merrill, and John LaPorta. His association with Davis lasted into the early 1960s; he also played with Kenny Burrell in 1964.

References
"Lou Mucci". The New Grove Dictionary of Jazz. 2nd edition, ed. Barry Kernfeld.

1909 births
2000 deaths
American jazz trumpeters
American male trumpeters
Musicians from New York (state)
20th-century trumpeters
20th-century American male musicians
American male jazz musicians
Glenn Miller Orchestra members